Jilemnice is a town in Semily District in the Liberec Region of the Czech Republic. It has about 5,400 inhabitants. The historic town centre is well preserved and is protected by law as an urban monument zone.

Administrative parts

Villages of Hrabačov and Javorek are administrative parts of Jilemnice.

Geography
Jilemnice is located about } southeast of Liberec. It lies in a hilly landscape of the Giant Mountains Foothills.

The Jilemka stream flows through the town into the Jizerka river, which flows through the northern part of the municipal territory.

History
Jilemnice was founded at the beginning of the 14th century as an economic centre of an extensive Štěpanice manor owned by the Waldstein family. The regular ground plan of the historic centre indicates that the town was probably founded on a green field. Because of its secluded location, the town developed in a slower pace than other towns in fertile inland. However, Jilemnice's isolation protected the town against serious war damage for years. The town development was even more restricted from 1492 when the Waldstein family divided the manor into two parts.

In the 15th and 16th centuries, the main economic activities were ore mining and linen production. During the Thirty Years' War the town was burned down by Swedish army and after the war, the town failed to follow up on the previous sources of livelihood.

In 1701, both parts of the manor were acquired and merged by the Harrach noble family. Since then, Jilemnice began to prosper again. Harrachs' progressive economic policy led to raising of local linen industry to the world level. During the first half of the 19th century, the linen industry gradually declined. In 1873, the Textile Industrial School was founded.

Until 1918, Jilemnice was part of the Austrian monarchy (Austria side after the compromise of 1867), head of the district of the same name, one of the 94 Bezirkshauptmannschaften in Bohemia.

Demographics

Sights

The main landmark of the town is Jilemnice Castle. It is a Renaissance building from the 16th century, built on the site of a former fortress. Between 1714 and 1895, it was gradually rebuilt into its present form. Today it houses the Giant Mountains Museum.

Notable people

František Pošepný (1836–1895), geologist
Jan Weiss (1892–1972), writer
Jaroslav Havlíček (1896–1943), writer
Josef Jan Hanuš (1911–1992), World War II pilot
Jakub Hlava (born 1979), ski jumper
Aleš Vodseďálek (born 1985), Nordic combined skier
Eva Puskarčíková (born 1991), biathlete

Twin towns – sister cities

Jilemnice is twinned with:
 Świebodzice, Poland
 Świeradów-Zdrój, Poland

References

External links

Cities and towns in the Czech Republic
Populated places in Semily District